The Price of Success is a 2017 French drama film directed by Teddy Lussi-Modeste. It was screened in the Special Presentations section at the 2017 Toronto International Film Festival.

Cast
 Tahar Rahim
 Roschdy Zem
 Maïwenn

References

External links
 

2017 films
2017 drama films
French drama films
2010s French-language films
2010s French films